Stenalia escherichi is a beetle in the genus Stenalia of the family Mordellidae. It was described in 1899 by Schilsky.

References

escherichi
Beetles described in 1899